René Robert Bouché (20 September 1905? 3 July 1963) was an artist and fashion illustrator, known for his work in Vogue magazine between the 1930s and 1960s.

Life and career

René Bouché was born in Prague on 20 September 1905. He studied at Ludwig Maximilian University of Munich before moving to Paris. In 1938, he began working for Vogue magazine.

During the Second World War, he emigrated to the United States, settling in Manhattan, where he continued working for Vogue. Bouche painted portraits of many prominent figures including W. H. Auden, Nancy Astor, Truman Capote, Jean Cocteau, Benny Goodman, Aldous Huxley, Edward Kennedy, Jacqueline Kennedy, John F. Kennedy, Willem de Kooning, Sophia Loren, Igor Stravinsky and the Duchess of Windsor. His illustrations were noted for their accuracy and decisiveness.

Death
Bouché died of a heart attack, age 57, in East Grinstead, England.

See also

 List of illustrators
 List of Ludwig Maximilian University of Munich people
 List of people from Prague

External links

References 

1900s births
1963 deaths
20th-century Czech artists
Austro-Hungarian emigrants to the United Kingdom
Fashion illustrators
Ludwig Maximilian University of Munich alumni
People from East Grinstead
Artists from Prague
Vogue (magazine) people